Anoplocapros lenticularis, the white-barred boxfish, is a species of deepwater boxfish found in Australia.

Description
The species has the compact body of many Tetraodontiformes, with small fins and a protruding snout. Adults may reach a length of 33 cm.

White-barred boxfishes bare vein-like ossified plates under their bodies, making them mostly immobile other than the fins, gills, mouth, and tail.

Distribution
The species inhabits the continental shelf off southern Western Australia and western South Australia.

References

Fish of Australia
Aracanidae